Heinrich Finkelstein (31 July 1865 in Leipzig, Germany – 28 January 1942 in Santiago de Chile), was a German Jewish pediatrician and a pioneer in pediatric nutrition.

Life
His father was a businessman and the head of the local Jewish community in Leipzig. Heinrich studied first Natural Sciences in Munich and Leipzig, and eventually awarded a Ph.D. in Geology. Only then he began the study of Medicine, graduating in 1892.

Career
He chose to specialize in Pediatrics under Prof. Otto Heubner, following him from Leipzig to Berlin, where Heubner had been appointed as the first professor of Pediatrics at the Charité. From 1901 to 1918 Finkelstein was the assistant medical director of the Berlin Asylum Kürassierstraße for Children and the Municipal Orphanage, where he combined medical skills with social commitment.

In 1910 Finkelstein, together with Langstein, von Pfaundler, von Pirquet, and Salge, founded the Zeitschrift für Kinderheilkunde.

In 1918, after the death of Adolf Aron Baginsky, he was appointed Medical Director of the Emperor and Empress Frederick Children's Hospital in Berlin. His scientific work was mainly on eating disorders, skin diseases and birth-related damage to the newborn.

As medical director of the Emperor and Empress Frederick Children's Hospital, Finkelstein reduced the infant mortality rate to 4.3%, a value not to be exceeded in Germany until many decades later. His idea of a comprehensive public infant care was ahead of time, some of which was not realized until decades later. In 1905 he called for inter alia the extension of the statutory care for working pregnant women and new mothers, the introduction of an appropriate rest period before and after delivery, the free distribution of a "perfect" baby milk to the poor and the establishment of infant homes. Together with Ludwig Ferdinand Meyer, he developed the first artificial milk protein milk, thus saving the life of thousands  of infants who suffered from eating disorders.
Although respected and honored internationally as a pediatrician, being a Jew, he never received an Ordinary professorship and was only a lecturer at the Berlin University.
On 1 March 1933, shortly before the Nazis gained power, he retired. But in 1935, he lost his teaching position and license to practice medicine. In 1936 he was invited as visiting professor to Chicago but soon returned to Berlin to be near his sister, his only family (he never married).

The November pogrom of 1938 led him to leave Germany for good. Heinrich Finkelstein immigrated to Chile, but he was too old and too sick to start again from scratch. Salvador Allende, who later became Chile's president, was then the health minister, and put him an honorary pension which was withdrawn shortly after the fall of the government. Colleagues from the University of Santiago procured him a pro forma appointment as doorman to the Hospital, which secured him his daily bread. Nevertheless, in difficult cases, he kept being called as a consultant.

Finkelstein's wrote a book on infant diseases (Lehrbuch der Säuglingskrankheiten) that was printed both in German and Spanish, in which he summarized his experience and his vision of a holistic medicine. This work became a standard reference textbook for generations of pediatricians in Europe and Latin America, well into the postwar period.

On 28 January 1942 Heinrich Finkelstein died in Santiago de Chile.

Works
Heinrich Finkelstein: Der Laubenstein bei Hohen-Aschau. Ein Beitrag zur Kenntnis der Brachiopodenfacies des unteren alpinen Doggers. Dissertation, München 1888. (Auch in: Neues Jahrbuch für Mineralogie. Beilageband VI)
Heinrich Finkelstein: Die durch Geburtstraumen hervorgerufenen Krankheiten des Säuglings. Fischers Medizinische Buchhandlung, Berlin 1902 (Berliner Klinik, Heft 168)
Heinrich Finkelstein: Lehrbuch der Säuglingskrankheiten. Privatdruck, Fischers Medizinische Buchhandlung, Berlin 1903–1912
Louis Ballin, Heinrich Finkelstein: Die Waisensäuglinge Berlins und ihre Verpflegung im Städtischen Kinderasyl. Ein Beitrag zu Fragen der Anstaltsbehandlung von Säuglingen. Urban & Schwarzenberg, Berlin, Wien 1904
Heinrich Finkelstein: Lehrbuch der Säuglingskrankheiten. Verlag H. Kornfeld, Berlin 1905–1912
Heinrich Finkelstein, Ludwig F. Meyer: Über Eiweißmilch. Ein Beitrag zum Problem der künstlichen Ernährung. Karger, Berlin 1910 in  Jahrbuch für Kinderheilkunde. Bd. 71, der dritten Folge 21. Bd.)
Heinrich Finkelstein; Eugen Emanuel Galewsky; Ludwig Halberstaedter (Hrsg.): Hautkrankheiten und Syphilis im Säuglings- und Kindesalter. Ein Atlas. J. Springer, Berlin, 1922
Heinrich Finkelstein; Ferdinand Rohr: Die Behandlung der tuberkulösen Bauchfellerkrankungen im Kindesalter. Halle a. S. 1922–1923 (Sammlung zwangloser Abhandlungen aus dem Gebiete der Verdauungs- und Stoffwechselkrankheiten. Band 8,1)
Heinrich Finkelstein: Lehrbuch der Säuglingskrankheiten. 3., vollständig umgearbeitete Auflage, Julius Springer, Berlin 1924
Heinrich Finkelstein: Der gesunde Säugling. Safari Verlag, Berlin o.J. [um 1930]
Heinrich Finkelstein: Säuglingskrankheiten. Elsevier, Amsterdam 1938
Heinrich Finkelstein: Tratado de las enfermedades del lactante. Ed. Labor, Barcelona; Madrid; Buenos Aires; Rio de Janeiro 1941

Sources 
 Wunderlich P.: Heinrich Finkelstein (1865–1942)--pediatrician and pioneer in social pediatrics. A biographical sketch]. Kinderarztl Prax. 1990 Nov;58(11):587-92.Article in German
 Robert J. Karp, MD; Sabine Chlosta, MD: Failure to Thrive: Recalling Milton Levine and Heinrich Finkelstein Pediatric Annals November 2008
 I. A. A.: HEINRICH FINKELSTEIN, M.D. 1865–1942 Obituaries | March 1942 Am J Dis Child. 1942;63(3):582.
 Biography in the website of the Charite Hospital

External link

1865 births
1942 deaths
Jewish emigrants from Nazi Germany to Chile
German pediatricians
Jewish scientists
19th-century German Jews